Habronestes bradleyi is a spider species of the family Zodariidae.

Like most Zodariidae, H. bradleyi is an ant-eating spider. It detects the alarm pheromone of ants to locate them. It raises its forelegs, which contain the chemoreceptors to detect the pheromone. However, they themselves also mimic the pheromone.

Distribution
H. bradleyi is a species from Australia.

References
 Allan, R.A., Elgar, M.A., Capon, R.J. (1996). Exploitation of an ant chemical alarm signal by the zodariid spider Habronestes bradley Walckenaer. Proceedings of the Royal Society, London 263:69-73.
 Baehr, B. (2003). Revision of the Australian Spider Genus Habronestus (Araneae: Zodariidae). Species of New South Wales and the Australian Capital Territory. Records of the Australian Museum 55(3):343-376. PDF (7Mb) - 

Zodariidae
Spiders of Australia
Spiders described in 1869